Romanovka is a rural locality (a village) in Uguzevsky Selsoviet, Birsky District, Bashkortostan, Russia. The population was 62 as of 2010. There are 2 streets.

Geography 
Romanovka is located 20 km southeast of Birsk (the district's administrative centre) by road. Chishma is the nearest rural locality.

References 

Rural localities in Birsky District